Ruschell Boone (née West) is a Jamaican-born reporter and journalist based in New York City. She has worked for NY1 cable television news since 2002.

Early life and education 
Boone was born in Kingston, Jamaica. She immigrated to the Bronx in 1986 when she was 11, where she recalls being bullied for her Jamaican accent. She lived in a blended family with her mother Faithlyn (Swaby) and stepfather Duke Scott.

Boone earned a degree in accounting from City University of New York (CUNY) Baruch College. Although she picked accounting to ensure a good living, she discovered her passion for journalism in her senior year when she took over a college radio segment for a missing guest. Boone's academic counselor tried to dissuade her from a career change, saying that it was too late for her to change paths and that she did not "fit the mold".

Career 
Working in cable television news since 1998, Boone was a business news associate for CNBC and then an associate producer and assignment editor for CNN. She joined NY1 in 2002.

As a reporter for NY1, she has covered breaking stories such as the 2016 pressure-cooker bombing in Manhattan and the 2016 presidential election. She became a general assignment reporter for NY1's Live at Ten newscast in 2018. In 2019, Boone was nominated for three New York Emmy Awards for news reporting and work on NY1's talk shows, and in 2020 she was nominated again as a live reporter.

Awards 
 New York Press Club Award for Best Feature Reporting – 2013
 New York Association of Black Journalists award for Best Spot News Reporting – 2014
 City & State list of Queens Most Influential Leaders – 2016, 2019, 2020
 Queens District Attorney's William Tucker Garvin Public Service Award – 2019

Personal life 
On 24 September 2005, Ruschell West married Todd Boone, a production technician at NY1. They have two children. In 2022, she took medical leave from NY1 for successful treatment of pancreatic cancer.

References

External links 
 RuschellBoone.com – official website

Living people
1970s births
Baruch College alumni
People from Kingston, Jamaica
Television anchors from New York City
American women television journalists
African-American women journalists
20th-century American journalists
21st-century American journalists
20th-century African-American women
20th-century African-American people
21st-century African-American women